Dutch Uncle may refer to:
 Dutch uncle, a term for a person who issues frank, harsh, and severe comments and criticism
 Dutch Uncle (novel), by Marilyn Durham
 Dutch Uncle (play), by Simon Gray
 Dutch Uncles, a British indie pop band